Starlight Express is a 1984 British musical, with music by Andrew Lloyd Webber and lyrics by Richard Stilgoe. It tells the story of a young but obsolete steam engine, Rusty, who races in a championship against modern engines in the hope of impressing a first-class observation car, Pearl. Famously, the actors perform on roller skates.

Starlight Express is the ninth-longest-running West End show and the most successful musical in Germany, where it has been performed in a purpose-built theatre since 1988, holding the Guinness World Record for most visitors to a musical in a single theatre.

Background
Starlight Express has its roots in three abandoned projects: an animated TV series based on Thomas the Tank Engine, a novelty pop single, and an animated film based on Cinderella.

In 1974, Lloyd Webber approached author Reverend W. Awdry about adapting Awdry's Thomas the Tank Engine stories as an animated TV series. Following the meeting, Lloyd Webber started composing, with actor and children's TV writer Peter Reeves contributing lyrics, alongside artist Brian Cosgrove animating for it. They pitched their material to Granada TV, who commissioned a pilot episode. The episode was completed in early 1976, but Granada ultimately decided not to produce a full series as they feared that Awdry's stories were not then popular enough outside the UK to justify investing the time and money needed to make the series. (Ironically, the Thomas the Tank Engine series later premiered seven months after Starlight Express and became highly successful.)

After withdrawing from the project, Lloyd Webber heard a recording of an American soul singer, Earl Jordan, who could sing three notes at once in the style of a steam whistle. Lloyd Webber and Peter Reeves wrote a novelty pop song for Jordan called "Engine of Love", which was released in 1977. The song failed to chart, but "Engine of Love" went on to feature in some productions of Starlight Express and the melody was also later used for "He'll Whistle At Me".

Around the same time as writing "Engine of Love", an American TV station invited Lloyd Webber to compose songs for an animated film of Cinderella. In this version of the story, the Prince would hold a competition to decide which engine would pull the royal train across the United States of America. Cinderella would be a steam engine and the ugly sisters would be a diesel engine and an electric engine. The project went into development hell, but Lloyd Webber remained interested in the idea of telling a story with trains.

Starlight Express proper began in early 1981. Lloyd Webber asked lyricist Richard Stilgoe to help him revive the idea as a concert for schools, in the style of Lloyd Webber's breakthrough musical, Joseph and the Amazing Technicolor Dreamcoat. Lloyd Webber and Stilgoe presented two songs the following summer at the Sydmonton Festival, Lloyd Webber's private event for showcasing new work. The director Trevor Nunn watched the performance and offered to help develop the material from something "twee" to something with more "spectacle and theatre magic".

Together, Lloyd Webber, Stilgoe and Nunn developed the story to include the idea of trains and coaches racing. The choreographer Arlene Phillips was brought on board along with the designer John Napier, who suggested staging the show on roller skates.

In 1983 the first act of Starlight Express was workshopped by Nunn and Phillips with a cast that included the comedian Tracey Ullman. Based on the workshop's success, Starlight Express went into full-scale production, opening in the West End in March 1984.

Synopsis
Starlight Express has been revised many times since it was first produced. These revisions range from tweaks to lyrics, to the addition or removal of entire songs, characters and sub-plots. The fundamental story, however, has stayed the same.

This synopsis reflects the show as it was first produced, in the West End in 1984.

Act 1 
A young boy falls asleep as he plays with his toy trains. In his dreams, the trains come to life.

The reigning champion – a diesel engine from the USA called Greaseball – enters with his cavalcade train of several other diesel engines and three freight trucks. They boast of diesel's supremacy ("Rolling Stock"). Next, a steam engine called Rusty enters. Greaseball mocks Rusty, who replies that he will win the championship, despite steam being obsolete compared to diesel ("Call Me Rusty"). The dreaming boy, Control, intervenes and orders Rusty to collect a passenger train from the marshalling yard. He returns with four coaches that make up the passenger train: a dining car called Dinah, a smoking car called Ashley, a buffet car called Buffy, and an observation car called Pearl. Control sends Rusty away to fetch a freight train as the coaches introduce themselves to the audience ("A Lotta Locomotion"). Greaseball returns. He boasts again, this time to the coaches ("Pumping Iron"). Rusty returns with the six trucks that make up the freight train: three boxcars called Rocky 1, Rocky 2 and Rocky 3, a brick truck called Flat-Top, an aggregate hopper called Dustin and a brake truck called C.B.. They introduce themselves to the audience and argue with the coaches over whether it is preferable to carry people or cargo ("Freight").

Control declares entries for the championship open. Six trains arrive to challenge Greaseball: Bobo, the French Sud-Est; Espresso, the Italian Settebello; Weltschaft, the German Class 103; Turnov, the Trans-Siberian Express from Russia; Hashamoto, the Japanese Shinkansen Bullet Train; and the City of Milton Keynes, the Advanced Passenger Train from Great Britain. Entries are about to close when a surprise entry – an electric engine called Electra – arrives. Accompanied by his train of five components – an armaments truck called Krupp, a repair truck called Wrench, a money truck called Purse, a freezer truck called Volta and an animal truck called Joule – Electra declares that electricity is the future of the railways ("AC/DC"). Greaseball and Electra square up to each other as the entrants form a parade to celebrate the race ("Coda of Freight").

Control announces the rules of the championship: the trains will compete in pairs, with an engine pulling a coach. There will be three elimination heats, and the winner of each heat will move on to the finals to decide the fastest train. The engines start to pick their coaches. Rusty offers to race with Pearl, but she rejects him, explaining that she is waiting for her 'dream train' ("He Whistled at Me"). Electra's messenger, Purse, enters with an invitation from Electra. Even though Electra is not her dream train either, she accepts, leaving Rusty alone.

The first heat pits Greaseball and Dinah against Espresso and Buffy, and Hashamoto and C.B.. C.B. sabotages Hashamoto by applying his brakes at key moments in the race. Greaseball and Dinah win comfortably, claiming a place in the finals. After the race, Dinah objects to Greaseball's cheating. In response he abandons her and C.B. comforts Dinah ("There's Me"). Meanwhile, a lonely Rusty has retreated to the freight yard where the former champion – an old steam engine called Poppa – sings a blues song to the trucks ("Poppa's Blues"). Poppa tries to persuade Rusty to race without Pearl, urging him to have faith in the Starlight Express. When Rusty refuses, Poppa introduces him to an old Pullman car called Memphis Belle ("Belle The Sleeping Car"). Rusty agrees to race with Belle. They compete in the second heat against Electra and Pearl, and Weltschaft and Joule. Electra and Pearl finish first, securing a place in the finals; Rusty and Belle finish in last place.

Already despondent after losing Pearl as his race partner, Rusty loses his last shreds of confidence. Poppa decides to step up and prove that steam power is still relevant, despite everyone's misgivings, by racing himself in the third heat. Only Dustin is willing to race with him. Rusty points out that the race is already full, but suddenly Control announces that the British train has been scrapped, leaving space for a late entry. Poppa interprets this as a sign from the Starlight Express and enters the race. The third heat pits Poppa and Dustin against Bobo and Ashley, and Turnov and Wrench. Poppa wins the race, securing a place in the finals against Greaseball and Electra, but the effort of outracing the others and pulling the hefty Dustin exhausts him. Now worn out, he begs Rusty to take his place. Rusty refuses at first, but then he notices Pearl with Electra and is jealous. When C.B. offers to race with him, Rusty announces that he will take Poppa's place. Greaseball and the other competitors mock him then leave. Alone, Rusty prays to the supposedly mythical Starlight Express for help in the final ("Starlight Express").

Act 2 
The trains debate whether Rusty should be allowed to take Poppa's place in the finals, since he's already competed and lost, or whether the place should go instead to Bobo, who finished second in Poppa's heat ("The Rap"). They ultimately decide to let Rusty race. Control offers the engines the chance to change partners. Pearl abandons Electra and joins Greaseball, leaving Dinah feeling betrayed. Dinah expresses her shame at being uncoupled, although she cannot bring herself to say the word itself ("U.N.C.O.U.P.L.E.D."). Ashley, Buffy and Belle try to persuade Dinah to fight for Greaseball's affections ("Rolling Stock (Reprise)"), but instead she accepts an offer from Electra to replace Pearl in the finals. Elsewhere, C.B. hatches a plan. He tells Greaseball he will help him win the championship by sabotaging Rusty. He then tells Electra he will wipe out Greaseball, clearing the way for Electra to win. When Electra expresses his surprise at C.B.'s duplicity, C.B. explains that he has spent a career secretly causing train crashes for fun ("C.B.").

The finals takes place between Electra and Dinah, Greaseball and Pearl, and Rusty and C.B. C.B. sabotages Rusty, slowing him down so he misses a switch on the tracks and cannot finish the race. Electra and Greaseball finish in a dead heat. Control announces that there will be another race, with Electra and Greaseball going head-to-head to decide the winner. Rusty complains that he was cheated, but the marshals refuse to listen. Pearl confronts Greaseball, but he warns her to say nothing, as the marshals would consider her complicit and punish her as well. Rusty retreats to the freight yard, where he bumps into the Rockies. They tell him that without luck, he will never win and that he should just give up ("Right Place, Right Time"). The Rockies leave Rusty alone. He appeals again to the mythical Starlight Express for help, and this time, it hears. The Starlight Express appears in front of Rusty and just happens to be Poppa being streamlined. He reminds him that whatever strength he needs – a starlight – is within him already and modifies him with a streamlining of his own ("I Am The Starlight"). Poppa disappears and Rusty finds himself back in the freight yard with Dustin, who says he was just asleep, but felt the starlight's presence. Rusty asks Dustin to race with him in the final. He accepts and they head off together.

Moments before the race, Dinah, angry with the way Electra treats her, disconnects from him. Electra quickly appeals to C.B. to take her place. The trains gather to watch what they expect will be a head-to-head final between Greaseball and Pearl, and Electra and C.B.. Suddenly Rusty arrives with Dustin, and the marshals allow him to enter the race. The race is fast and furious. This time, the downhill track turns Dustin's weight into an advantage for Rusty. Greaseball struggles with an unwilling Pearl holding him back, and Electra uses all his power to disrupt his opponents. Electra zaps electricity at Greaseball, but misses and injures Pearl. Greaseball, showing no concern, simply disconnects Pearl at full speed. Rusty diverts from the race course just in time to save her, but at the cost of falling into a distant third place. To avoid being disqualified for not having a coach, Greaseball starts to grapple with Electra over C.B. The fight degenerates into chaos and Greaseball, Electra and C.B. crash, allowing Rusty to win the race. But instead of celebrating, he leaves immediately to find Pearl. Control warns that, if Rusty does not return quickly, his lap of honor will be cancelled.

Meanwhile, humiliated and furious, Electra leaves the race track, swearing never to return ("No Comeback"). Greaseball and C.B. emerge in a tangled wreck. They lament the heavy toll that racing has taken on them ("One Rock 'n' Roll Too Many"). Poppa demands that Greaseball and C.B. help find Rusty. Away from the other engines, Pearl fears that she caused Rusty to lose the race. She realises that of all the trains she's raced with, only Rusty ever acted selflessly towards her ("Only He"). Rusty arrives. He tells Pearl that he won the race and confesses his love for her ("Only You"). The other trains arrive. Greaseball finally apologises to Dinah for his behavior and they reconcile. Greaseball complains that he's finished as a racer, but Poppa offers to rebuild him as a steam engine. Control tries to assert some control, announcing that Rusty's lap of honor is cancelled. Tired of Control's behavior, Poppa and the other engines tell Control to "shut it" and celebrate the second coming of steam power ("Light at the End of the Tunnel").

Characters

Voices only
 Control – A child playing with toy trains, which become the characters featured in the story.
 Mom – Control's mother.

Engines
 Rusty – the play's protagonist. He is a steam engine who longs to enter the race and win the heart of Pearl.
 Ramblin' Poppa/Mama McCoy – the old steam engine who was once a racing champion, is the predecessor of Rusty and now acts as a mentor and guardian to him and the freight trucks.
 Greaseball – the macho Union Pacific diesel engine who was formerly crowned by Control as the reigning champion and one of the play's antagonists.
 Electra – a futuristic electric engine who is known as "the Engine of the Future" and one of the play's main antagonists.

Coaches
 Pearl the Observation Car – the newest 1st class observation car who is searching for her "dream train".
 Dinah the Dining Car – a sweet, romantic and lovable dining car.
 Ashley the Smoking Car – a wise, smoky and sexy smoking car.
 Buffy the Buffet Car – a smart, sassy, hot, cheap and quick buffet car.
 (Memphis) Belle the Sleeping Car – an old but luxurious Pullman 1st class sleeping car from the USA (designated as a Pullman car in 1984, cut from all productions after Broadway)
 Duvay the Sleeping Car (replaced Ashley in the 2012 UK tour and licensed amateur productions)
 Carrie the Luggage Car (replaced Buffy in the 30th Anniversary Bochum production)
 Belle the Bar Car (replaced Ashley in the 30th Anniversary Bochum production. No relation to Memphis Belle)
 Tassita the Quiet Car (only featured in the 2017 workshop at The Other Palace Theatre in London)
 Belle the Sleeping Car (only featured in the 2017 workshop at The Other Palace Theatre in London. No relation to Memphis Belle)

National champions
These minor characters have frequently been renamed and substituted throughout various productions.
 Bobo/Coco – the TGV Sud-Est or Underwater Train engine from France.
 Espresso – the Settebello or Pizza Express engine from Italy.
 Weltschaft/Ruhrgold/The Flying Hamburger/Rhinegold– the Class 103, or ICE engine from Germany.
 Turnov – the Trans-Siberian Express engine from Russia.
 Hashamoto/Hashimoto/Nintendo/Nakamura/Yamamoto/Manga– the Shinkansen Bullet Train engine from Japan.
 The City of Milton Keynes/The Prince of Wales/Brexit – the Advanced Passenger, British Royal or High Speed Train to Nowhere engine from Great Britain.

(Starlight Express on Ice also included Canuck the Canadian Engine and Cesar the Mexican Engine. Expreso Astral included Carioca the Brazilian Engine, El Pibe the Argentinian Engine, Chen the Chinese Engine, and Conan the French Orient Express Engine.)

Freight trucks
 Rocky 1, 2, 3 and 4 – a quartet of boxcars. Rocky 4 was introduced to Broadway and Bochum in 1987, following the release of Rocky IV, although he was quickly removed.
 Hip Hopper 1, 2 and 3 (replaced the Rockies in the US/UK Tours and the revised Bochum production)
 Flat-Top – a brick truck who longs to become a new member of Greaseball's gang.
 Dustin – a big iron aggregate hopper who is a friend of Rusty. He is shy and sensitive about his weight.
 C.B./The Red Caboose/Caboose – a brake truck. He is a two-faced mischief-maker who causes disaster wherever he goes. A major character and the villain in the original plot, he was cut during revisions to the London production, although remained a main character in other productions.

Electra's entourage of components
 Krupp the Armaments Truck- Electra's bodyguard (removed from the US/UK Tours and the Bochum production in 2017)
 Wrench the Repair Truck
 Purse the Money Truck (removed from the 2018 30th Anniversary Bochum Production)
 Volta the Freezer Truck
 Joule the Animal/Dynamite Truck
 Killerwatt the Security Truck (replaced Krupp and Purse in the 30th Anniversary Bochum Production)

Ensemble
 Trax/The Track/Flying Marshal 1 and 2 – a duo of trick-skating freight trucks who wear rollerblades rather than quad skates and function as race marshals, but do not sing. They wield the start and finish flags at the beginning and end of the races, tow crashed engines off the track and decide on the outcome of the aborted "Uphill Final".
 The 2nd and 3rd Class Sleeping Cars – originally portrayed by the same performers as Joule and Volta in the original 1984 production and removed during the show's revisions.
 The Gang – a gang of unruly diesel engine and freight trucks who follow Greaseball.

Musical numbers
The musical numbers in Starlight Express have changed many times since the first production opened in 1984. Each new production is "re-invented ... rewritten, rearranged, restaged and brought up to date ... rather than just [being] a copy of the original". This is because the show was envisaged as an introduction to live theatre for young audiences, particularly audiences "for whom theatre was a no-go zone". The score is grounded in popular music, which changes with each generation. Therefore, as Lloyd Webber has said, "Starlight Express by its nature has to change".

Later productions have used additional songs with lyrics by Don Black, David Yazbek, Nick Coler and Lauren Aquilina, and with music by Andrew Lloyd Webber's son, Alistair.

This list shows the musical numbers in the original West End production, then which numbers have been added or removed over the years.

Act 1
 Overture - Control
 Rolling Stock – Greaseball and Gang
 Taunting Rusty – Rusty, Greaseball, Gang
 Call Me Rusty – Rusty, Pearl, Dinah, Buffy and Ashley
 Rusty, You Can't Be Serious – Rusty, Pearl, Dinah, Buffy and Ashley
 A Lotta Locomotion – Dinah, Ashley, Buffy and Pearl †
 Pumping Iron – Greaseball, Pearl, Ashley, Dinah, Buffy, 2nd and 3rd class Sleepers
 Freight – Pearl, Ashley, Dinah, Buffy, Rocky I, Rocky II, Rocky III, C.B, Dustin, Flat-Top
 Entry of the National Engines – The Company
 AC/DC – Electra, Krupp, Wrench, Purse, Joule, Volta and Company
 Coda of Freight – The Company
 Hitching and Switching – The Company
 He Whistled at Me – Pearl †
 Pearl, You've Been Honored – Purse, Pearl, Rusty
 Race: Heat 1 – Greaseball, Dinah, Espresso, Buffy, Hashamoto, CB
 That Was Unfair – Dinah, Greaseball, C.B.
 There's Me – C.B. †
 Poppa's Blues – Poppa, Rocky I, Rocky II, Rocky III, Rusty
 Belle the Sleeping Car – Belle †
 Starlight Introduction – Poppa, Belle, Rusty
 Race: Heat 2 – Electra, Pearl, Weltschaft, Joule, Rusty, Belle
 Boy, Boy, Boy – Poppa, Rusty, Belle, Trucks
 Race: Heat 3 – Bobo, Ashley, Turnov, Wrench, Poppa, Dustin †
 Laughing Stock – The Company
 Starlight Express – Rusty

Act 2
 The Rap – The Company
 Pearl Twirl – Greaseball, Pearl, Dinah, Buffy, Ashley
 U.N.C.O.U.P.L.E.D. – Dinah
 Girls' Rolling Stock – Dinah, Belle, Ashley and Buffy †
 C.B. – C.B., Electra, Krupp, Wrench, Purse, Joule, Volta
 Race: Uphill Final – Greaseball, Pearl, Electra, Dinah, Rusty, CB
 I Was Robbed – C.B., Rusty, Greaseball and Pearl
 Right Place, Right Time – Rocky I, Rocky II, Rocky III
 I Am The Starlight – Rusty, Starlight Express, Dustin
 Rusty and Dustin – Rusty, Dustin
 Dinah's Disco – Dinah, Electra, Krupp, Wrench, Purse, Volta, Joule, C.B. †
 Race: Downhill Final – Greaseball, Pearl, Electra, CB, Rusty, Dustin
 No Comeback – Electra, Krupp, Wrench, Purse, Joule, Volta †
 One Rock & Roll Too Many – Greaseball, C.B.
 Only He – Pearl †
 Only You – Pearl, Rusty †
 Light at the End of the Tunnel – The Company

The New Starlight Express (1992)
Overture - Control, Mom 
Entry of National Engines - Control, Bobo, Expresso, Ruhrgold,  Turnov, Nintendo, The Prince of Wales. 
Rolling Stock - Greaseball, Gang
Taunting Rusty - Rusty,  Nationals Engines, Gang
Call Me Rusty - Rusty,  Pearl,  Dinah, Buffy, Ashley
 Rusty,  Can't Be Serious - Pearl,  Dinah,  Ashley,  Buffy
A Lotta Locomotion -  Pearl,  Dinah,  Buffy,  Ashley
He'll Whistle at Me - Pearl,  Dinah,  Ashley,  Buffy,  Pearl
Freight -  Pearl,  Ashley,  Dinah,  Buffy,  Rocky 1, Rocky 2,  Rocky 3, Dustin,  Flat - Top
AC/DC - Electra,  Krupp,  Wrench,  Purse,  Joule, Volta,  Company
Pumping Iron - Greaseball,  Coaches, Joule,  Volta,  Wrench
Coda of Freight -  The Company
Hitching and Switching - Control, Buffy, Ashley, Pearl, Rusty
Crazy -  Rusty,  Pearl, Coaches
Pearl,  You've Been Honoured - Pearl,  Rusty,  Purse
Make Up My Heart -  Pearl,  Rusty
 Race One - Control
Poppa's Blues - Poppa,  Rocky 3, Flat - Top,  Rocky 2, Dustin
After Blues -  Rockies,  Poppa,  Rusty,  Dustin
Starlight Short - Poppa,  Control, Rusty,  Rocky 1, Flat - Top,  Dustin
Race Two - Control,  Poppa
Laughing Stock - Poppa,  Rusty, Greaseball,  Gang,  Freight,  Electra,  Pearl, Components, Flat - Top,  Carriages, Bobo, Dustin
Starlight Express - Rusty

The Rap - The Company 
Pearl Whirl - Greaseball,  Pearl, Dinah,  Electra, Ashley,  Buffy,
UNCOUPLED - Dinah
Rolling Stock (Reprise) - Buffy, Ashley,  Dinah
Dinah,  You're Honoured - Purse,  Dinah,  Ashley,  Buffy,  Rusty
Race Three - Control
Terrorising Rusty - Greaseball,  Electra,  Gang,  Flat - Top,  Rusty,  Prince of Wales,  Turnov,  Pearl
Right Place Right Time -  Rocky 1,  Rocky 2, Rocky 3, Rusty
Rusty Alone - Rusty 
Starlight Sequence -  Rusty,  Starlight
Rusty and Dustin -  Rusty,  Dustin
Dinah's Disco -  Dinah,  Electra,  Buffy
Coda of Freight (Reprise)/Hymn to Victory -  The Company
Race Four - Control, Rusty
One Rock 'N' Roll To Many -  Electra,  Greaseball
After Rock 'N' Roll -  Control, Poppa,  Dustin, The Company
Next Time You Fall In Love - Pearl,  Rusty 
Long Live Rusty -  The Company,  Control,  Dinah,  Greaseball,  Poppa,  Electra
Light At The End Of The Tunnel -  Poppa,  Company
Megamix - Company
Playout -  The Band

† denotes songs no longer used in any production of Starlight Express.

Additional songs

These songs have been added to various incarnations of the show:

 "Engine of Love" (replacing "Call Me Rusty")
 "He'll Whistle at Me" - Used until it was cut in 1998, but got reinstated in bochum
 "Crazy" (replacing "Call Me Rusty")
"Make Up My Heart" (replacing "He Whistled at Me")
 "Next Time You Fall in Love" (lyrics by Don Black) (replacing "Only He"/"Only You")
 "A Whole Lotta Locomotion" (lyrics by David Yazbek) (replacing "A Lotta Locomotion")
 "I Do" (music Alistair Lloyd-Webber, lyrics by Nick Coler) (replacing "Only He"/"Only You")
 "I Got Me" (lyrics by Lauren Aquilina) (replacing "A Whole Lotta Locomotion")

Production history

West End (1984–2002)

The original production (1984–1992)

The first production of Starlight Express opened on 27 March 1984 at the Apollo Victoria Theatre. It was directed by Trevor Nunn. Arlene Phillips created the roller-skating choreography. John Napier designed by the set, which featured race tracks extending from the stage into the auditorium, as well as a six-tonne steel bridge which lifted and tilted to connect the various levels of the set.

The original cast included Stephanie Lawrence, Frances Ruffelle, Jeff Shankley, Jeffrey Daniel and Ray Shell.

The production received some minor updates after the Broadway show opened, bringing some new material across, such as "Engine of Love", "Make Up My Heart", and cutting "No Comeback".

The 'New' Starlight Express (1992–2002)

In November 1992, the London production was relaunched with major revisions as The New Starlight Express. Numerous changes from subsequent productions were incorporated:

 Twelve songs were removed: the Overture, "Engine of Love", "Call Me Rusty", "Hitching and Switching", "There's Me", "Belle The Sleeping Car", "Heat Three", "Wide Smile High Style", "No Comeback", "Only He" and "Only You".
 Five songs were added: "Crazy", "He'll Whistle at Me", "Make Up My Heart", "Next Time You Fall in Love", "The Megamix"
 "The Rap" that opens the second act was completely rewritten to become an anthem to racing.
 The "Entry of National Trains" was moved to the opening of the show. "Pumping Iron" was moved to after "AC/DC".
 The characters of Belle and C.B were cut. This required substantial changes to the plot as without a clear villain, Rusty, Electra and Greaseball had to cause their own problems or be the victims of circumstance to move the story along.
 Rather than winning a heat each, as in the five-race structure, Greaseball and Electra come first and second in the first heat, securing places in the final for each of them. Rusty now didn't race at all until the final, only reluctantly taking Poppa's place after the title song. After the Uphill Final, when Dinah uncouples Electra, with no C.B. he partners Buffy instead for the Downhill Final. At the end of the race, Electra and Greaseball now crashed accidentally, and Electra took C.B.'s place in "One Rock 'n' Roll Too Many".

Starlight Express closed in London on 12 January 2002. Considered one continuous production despite revisions, Starlight Express ran for 7,409 performances, making it the ninth longest-running West End show.

Broadway (1987–1989)
The Broadway production of Starlight Express began performances on Broadway on 24 February 1987, and opened on 15 March, at the Gershwin Theatre. It ran for 761 regular performances and 22 previews, closing on 8 January 1989.

Created by the original team of Trevor Nunn (direction), Arlene Phillips (choreography) and John Napier (design), this version of Starlight Express was extensively revised from the original West End production. The story was localised, with the trains now racing across America for a trophy called the "silver dollar". The plot was streamlined, with one fewer race compared to the West End production. Lloyd Webber and Stilgoe also made many changes to the music and lyrics, notably adding a ballad for Pearl, "Make Up My Heart", which has been included in every production since, and a reworked version of "Engine of Love", the novelty pop song Lloyd Webber wrote in 1977 for Earl Jordan. Additional adjustments were made to the costumes of characters including giving Rusty a "Starlight Express" outfit, which was deemed too similar to the rolling stock uniforms. This was eventually removed due to lack of quick-change time, and the costume not being different enough.

Bochum (1988 to present)
On 12 June 1988, Starlight Express opened at the purpose-built theatre  in Bochum, Germany. As of 2021 the new reimagined production was still running and has been seen by more than 17 million people. The musical stopped due to the COVID-19 pandemic.

The creative team included the choreographer and designer from the West End and Broadway productions, Arlene Phillips and John Napier, alongside a new director, Dion McHugh. Starlight Express in Bochum largely followed the template set by the Broadway production. However, the creative team made a further series of revisions, notably removing a character, Belle, who had been part of both the West End and Broadway productions. At the time of the Bochum production's opening, there were three markedly different versions of Starlight Express running concurrently. The production changed many times over the years most notably in 2018 to mark the show's 30th anniversary. After extensive workshops in London songs were cut, characters removed, female engines added and most notably Papa changed to Mama. Andrew Lloyd Webber and Arlene Philips felt the current zeitgeist was to make the show more “gender friendly”.

The Starlight Express Theater features tracks on three levels in a U-shape, with the audience sitting in the middle and around these tracks. That the venue took less than one year to build is documented in the Guinness Book of Records.

In March 2008, the production ran a talent competition called Musical Showstar 2008 on German television to find the next Rusty and Pearl. The competition was won by Kevin Köhler and Anna-Maria Schmidt. Schmidt dropped out of training, but Köhler premiered as Rusty on 1 August 2008.

Subsequent revisions 
The production has been updated periodically since 1988, taking in some changes from other worldwide productions:

 In 2003, the songs "Crazy", "Allein im Licht der Sterne" ("Next Time You Fall in Love") were added to the show, the latter replacing "Du Allein" ("Only You"). A "Megamix" was also added to the end of the show. "Liebesexpress" ("Engine of Love") was shortened. An extra track was added to the set, allowing greater flexibility of staging and more tricks for the skaters.
 In 2006 the Rockies were replaced by the Hip Hoppers from the second US tour.
 In 2007 the Rap was altered again.
 In 2008, the "Entry of the National Trains" was moved to the beginning of the show. "There's Me" was cut, and "Engine of Love" was replaced by shortened version of "Call Me Rusty". "Allein im Licht der Sterne" was cut. Additionally, the title song was reworked to the "When your goodnights have been said" lyric, "He'll Whistle at Me" had lyrics reworked, "The Rap" was changed to "It's Race Time", and the final duet between Rusty and Pearl was updated to the 2007 UK tour version of "Only He".
 In 2013, "A Whole Lotta Locomotion" ("Nie Genug") replaced "A Lotta Locomotion". "I Do" (Für Immer), a new song written for the 2012 UK and 2013 Asia tour by Lloyd Webber's son Alistair, replaced "Only He". Several songs had lyrics changed and costumes altered with a nod to the original London production.
In 2017, Krupp, Electra's armaments truck, was cut from the production.

2018 revisions 
In 2017 Lloyd Webber visited the production for the charity gala in which the show was performed in English, and found it 'unrecognisable' following years of incremental revisions. Arlene Phillips added that in 2018 the 'overall tone of the show [now appeared] a little bit sexist'. Lloyd Webber resolved to shut down the production if he could not find a way to 'get Starlight back to its roots'. He wrote new material, which was workshopped for six performances at The Other Palace in London in September 2017 before being rolled out in Bochum. Phillips directed the stripped back workshop production with no set, costumes or roller skates. These changes included:

 adding a new song and musical motif for the coaches called "I Got Me" ("Ich Bin Ich"), with lyrics by Lauren Aquilina
 removing several songs that no longer fit the theme
 substantially revising the orchestration in favor of a more rock-based 1980s sound
 reintroducing the Rockies, replacing the Hip Hoppers
 changing the genders of Poppa and Bobo from male to female, becoming 'Momma' and 'Coco'. Rocky 3 became female; Volta became male.
 replacing Ashley and Buffy with Belle, the lounge car, and Tassita, the quiet carriage (in the German production, Tassita would become Carrie the luggage car, and Belle became a bar car)
 replacing Electra's money truck, Purse, with Killerwatt, the security truck

In May 2018 the Bochum production closed for a month to rehearse the new material and for significant technical updates to the 30 year old auditorium. Lloyd Webber, Phillips and original designer John Napier returned to oversee the changes, which Lloyd Webber now considers the definitive version of Starlight Express. As well as the changes from The Other Palace, they also:

 updated the German lyrics of several songs within the show
 redesigned many costumes based on new designs
 installed completely new sound and lighting
 introduced the British train named 'Brexit' and renamed the Japanese train 'Manga'
 made some characters "gender variable": Rocky 3, Wrench, Volta, and Manga – although primarily meant to be female, female, male, and male respectively – may be played by an actor of a different gender if it's necessary due to vacations/injuries etc. of the original actor, as well as (as of June 2019) Brexit (original meant to be male).

Las Vegas (1993–1997)
An abridged, 90-minute production without an intermission opened at the Las Vegas Hilton on 14 September 1993, with direction by Arlene Phillips and with Reva Rice and Greg Ellis reprising their roles of Pearl and Rusty. Several songs were cut and many lyrics trimmed to make it fit into its 90-minute run time with great care taken to preserve the integrity of the plot. This production was the first permanent legitimate musical theatre production in Las Vegas, however concessions were made in the form of a shortened run time and betting references in the race sequences. Additionally, partway through the run the Coaches' costumes were given a "Vegas Showgirl" makeover. This production used the filmed race sequences from the first US tour (which played in the background during the live races on stage), as well as some of the set pieces. When the hotel changed ownership, the new owners decided to end the run before its 5-year contract concluded, with the show closing on 30 November 1997.

Mexico City (1997–1998) 
From October 1997 until April 1998, a Spanish-language production entitled Expreso Astral played at the Teatro Polanco in Mexico City. For the most part, it was a Spanish language version of the Las Vegas production (using the same edited script) with costumes and sets inspired by several earlier productions. The production was directed by Bobby Love, with the Spanish translation by Marco Villafan. Many of the character's names were Hispanicized, with Rusty becoming Ferro, Pearl becoming Perla, Poppa becoming El Jefe, and the National Engines were localised with Carioca, a Brazilian train, and Pibe, an Argentinian train. A cast recording of this production was made but, owing to complications with the rights, was never released.

Touring productions

North America 
A downsized version of the Broadway production, with a few changes, toured the US and Canada from November 1989 until April 1991. Rather than scaling the show up to fill stadiums, the set was small enough to fit regular regional theaters. The show was very much the same as the Australian/Japanese touring production with the "Silver Dollar" subplot being removed and the character of Memphis Belle being cut completely. With the "Silver Dollar" plot removed, an abbreviated version of "The Rap" from London was used to open Act II. The races were mostly shown on film, however a small race track extended out into the audience. The costumes were based on the original Broadway production and some were recycled directly from that earlier production.

The second US tour opened in Biloxi, Mississippi on 1 April 2003 and toured the US until 13 June 2004. The show was originally performed featuring the songs "Wide Smile", "Girls' Rolling Stock", and "Only He" but for reasons Troika (the production company) never disclosed it was later shortened by the removal of "Wide Smile" and "Girls' Rolling Stock" and "Only He" was replaced by "Next Time You Fall In Love". This production featured revisions to the material by David Yazbek, including a new song, "A Whole Lotta Locomotion", and rewriting "The Rap". Owing to the restrictions of touring spaces available, digital video company Inition were commissioned to produce high-definition race footage in 3D film to replace the live races.

Europe
The first UK tour of Starlight Express (now entitled Starlight Express: The Third Dimension) opened on 4 November 2004 in Manchester. The production was produced by David Ian Productions and directed by Mykal Rand. Originally adapted from the second U.S. tour, most of David Yazbek's contributions were removed after Andrew Lloyd Webber visited a performance. In November 2007 the first UK tour production toured Stockholm, Gothenburg, Oslo and Helsinki, using an expanded set designed for use in stadium venues.

Bill Kenwright Productions presented a second tour of the UK, beginning at the New Wimbledon Theatre on 10 May 2012. This production included a new song, "I Do", written by the composer's son, Alistair Lloyd-Webber in place of "Only You" or "Next Time You Fall in Love". Other changes included the character of Ashley The Smoking Car being replaced by Duvay The Sleeping Car, due to the recent British smoking ban, subsequent redundancy of smoking cars, and the general negative public attitude toward smoking. The production reused the race sequences filmed for the first UK tour.

Asia 
A large-scale, "in-the-round" production played stadiums in Tokyo and Osaka from November 1987 to January 1988. Due to the scale of this production, the National Engines and Electra's Entourage where doubled up to fill the performance area. This production was based on the Broadway production, with only minor changes such as the removal of Belle and the "Silver Dollar" subplot. The stage design was unique to this production, featuring landmarks such as Mount Rushmore and had a platform that could elevate up from the floor to change the setting of the races. This tour went on to Australia through 1988. Due to popular demand, the in-the-round tour returned to Japan from 24 March to 18 July 1990.

In 2013, the second UK tour traveled to Hong Kong, where it played at the Hong Kong Academy for Performing Arts from 11 October to 4 November 2013. From there it moved to Singapore, playing at the Marina Bay Sands from 13 November to 24 November 2013. This version of the show is licensed for amateur theatre groups as The Definitive Starlight Express.

Australia 
The large-scale tour that began in Japan in 1987 continued to Australia, where it visited Sydney, Brisbane, Melbourne, Adelaide and Perth, ending in May 1988. (During this tour, minor characters such as The Components and The Nationals were doubled and given alternate names in order to fill the larger arena sized set.)

New Zealand 

In 2009, following an extended run in Europe, the props and costumes from the second UK tour were shipped to New Zealand to form a new production. This production played arenas in Wellington, Christchurch and Auckland in July and August 2009, and featured some performers from various other international productions.

Non-replica productions

Starlight Express on Ice (1997)
As the first ever non-replica production of the show, it was completely re-designed by Feld Entertainment's On Ice unit with The Really Useful Co. It toured the United States from  until . The production was directed by Robin Cousins and featured figure- and stunt-skaters miming to pre-recorded music. It failed to find an audience and closed halfway through its scheduled tour.

Johannesburg, South Africa (2013) 
The South African premiere took place at the Joburg Theatre, running from July 2 until September 1, 2013. The production was directed by Janice Honeyman with choreography by Karen Bruce, who were given "Carte blanche" to re-imagine the show.

Regional and Amateur Licensed Productions 
The show is available to Regional and Schools groups in the USA. The regional premiere was performed in Tuacahn, Utah, in June 2013. It is licensed through The Musical Company As of June 2018, it appears that the Amateur licensed script will be updated to reflect the changes made to the flagship professional production in Germany, in line with the creative team's goals to update the show for the modern audience.

Cast

Awards and nominations

Original London production

Original Broadway production

Recordings

Cast Recordings

Charts

Singles

 Engine of Love/Steaming (1977)
 I am the Starlight/Starlight Express (1984)
 AC/DC/The C.B. Side (1984)
 Only You/Rolling Stock (1984)
 Only He (Has the Power to Move Me)/Engine Race (1984)
 The Race is On (Harold Faltermeyer)/The Race is On (Radio Edit)/The Race is On (Instrumental)/The Race is On (Dub Version) (1987)
 Er Allein/Ich Bin Wie Ich Bin – Angelika Milster (1988)
 The Train/Girls' Rolling Stock (1990)
 Only You (1992)
 Next Time You Fall in Love/Make Up My Heart/Mega Mix (1993)
 Crazy/Starlight Express/Allein Im Licht der Sterne/Mega Mix/Starlight Express (Boy Band Version) (2003)

References

External links

Starlight Express
Starlight Express Bochum

Original trailerson Vimeo

1984 musicals
Broadway musicals
West End musicals
Musicals by Andrew Lloyd Webber
Trains in fiction
Sung-through musicals
Fantasy theatre
British musicals
Plays about rail transport
Tony Award-winning musicals